Coup of 1926 might refer to several historical events:
 May Coup in Poland (12-14 May)
 28 May 1926 coup d'état in Portugal
 1926 Lithuanian coup d'état (17 December)